Beilun Gymnasium is an indoor sporting arena located in Ningbo, China.  The maximum capacity of the arena is 8,000 spectators, fixed seats are 4,000.  It hosts indoor sporting events such as basketball and volleyball, and also hosts concerts. It host the final round of the FIVB World Grand Prix 2010 and FIVB World Grand Prix 2012.

External links
Arena information

Indoor arenas in China
Sports venues in Zhejiang